Kenny Demens (born February 4, 1990) is a former American football linebacker. He most recently played for the Arizona Cardinals of the National Football League (NFL). He spent the 2013 on the Cardinals practice squad, after playing his redshirt senior season in 2012 for the Michigan Wolverines football team. He was a 2011 honorable mention All-Big Ten Conference selection and the 2011 team leader in tackles. In 2014, he began the season on the active roster. He had a season-ending injury in 2015 and was cut in 2016.

High school
Detroit Country Day reached the 2007 Michigan High School Athletic Association Division 4 State Championship game at Ford Field. Demens recorded 11 tackles in the game. Demens was regarded as the 23rd, 23rd and 35th best high school football linebacker in the country as a senior by Scout.com, Rivals.com and ESPN.com, respectively. Rivals also ranked him as the eighth best high school football player in the state of Michigan.

College
Demens saw action as a true freshman in three games under first-year head coach Rich Rodriguez for the 2008 Wolverines.

Demens became a starter in the October 16 game against Iowa, and by the end of the season he recorded 10 tackles or more four times. He posted 12 tackles (5 solo and 7 assists) against Penn State on October 30, 10 tackles (5 solo and 5 assists) against Illinois on November 6, a career-high 13 (5 solo and 8 assists) against Wisconsin on November 20, and a career-high-tying 13 tackles (9 solo and 4 assists) against Mississippi State in the January 1, 2011 Gator Bowl.

Under new first-year head coach Brady Hoke, Demens led the 2011 Wolverines in tackles and recorded his first three (2 solo and 2 assists) quarterback sacks. His solo sacks came against Northwestern on October 8 and Illinois on November 12. He recorded ten or more tackles three times.  He posted 12 tackles (8 solo and 4 assists) in the rivalry game against Notre Dame on September 10 in the first night game played at Michigan Stadium, 10 tackles (5 solo and 5 assists) against Northwestern on October 8 and 11 tackles (3 solo and 8 assists) against Iowa on November 5. He was an honorable mention 2011 All-Big Ten Conference selection by both the coaches and the media for the 2011 team. Demens led the team and finished among the conference leaders in tackles/game (7.2, t-13th). He was named the 2011 winner of The Roger Zatkoff Award as the team's top linebacker.

Professional career
On April 29, 2013, following the 2013 NFL Draft, Demens signed an undrafted free agent contract with the Arizona Cardinals for 3 years and $1,485,000. Demens survived the final roster cuts to make the 53-man roster, but when the Cardinals were awarded two waiver claims, they released Demens to make room on the roster. Although the Cardinals had three inside linebackers on the roster — Karlos Dansby, Jasper Brinkley and rookie Kevin Minter — they added Demens to the practice squad. In 2014, he began the season on the team's official active roster. Demens was lost for the season after an October 11 ACL injury for the 2015 Cardinals against the Detroit Lions. Demens was cut by the Cardinals prior to the 2016 season.

Notes

External links
Demens @ NCAA.org
Demens @ CBS Sports
Demens Michigan Bio
Demens @ ESPN

1990 births
Living people
American football linebackers
Detroit Country Day School alumni
Arizona Cardinals players
Michigan Wolverines football players
Sportspeople from Oakland County, Michigan
Players of American football from Michigan